Metro Vancouver Electoral Area A is a part of Metro Vancouver in British Columbia. It includes several unincorporated areas: the University Endowment Lands and the University of British Columbia, west of the City of Vancouver; Bowyer, Passage, and Barnston Islands; the west side of Pitt Lake; the northern portion of Indian Arm; and a large area to the north of the North Shore that is mostly mountainous and sparsely populated except for certain subdivisions between Horseshoe Bay and the Village of Lions Bay.

The Electoral Area is represented by a director on the board of the regional district. This is an elected position, with a four-year term. The current director is Jen McCutcheon.

Communities 
Barnston Island
Buntzen Bay
Gambier Island Trust Area (part)
Bowyer Island
Passage Island
Granite Falls
Strachan Creek
University Endowment Lands

Demographics 
In the 2021 Census, Statistics Canada reported that Metro Vancouver A had a population of 18,612 living in 7,682 of its 9.201 total dwellings, a 15.4% change from its 2016 population of 16,133.

Notes

See also 
 List of regional district electoral areas in British Columbia

References 

Community Profile: Greater Vancouver Regional District Electoral Area A, British Columbia; Statistics Canada

External links 
 Metro Vancouver website for Electoral Area A

Regional district electoral areas in British Columbia
University Endowment Lands
Barnston Island (British Columbia)